Frederick Richard Croot (30 November 1885 – 1958) was an English footballer who played in the Football League for Leeds City and Sheffield United.

References

1885 births
1958 deaths
English footballers
Association football forwards
English Football League players
Wellingborough Town F.C. players
Sheffield United F.C. players
Leeds City F.C. players
Rangers F.C. players
Clydebank F.C. (1914) players